Samuel Walker (born ) is an Australian male volleyball player. He is part of the Australia men's national volleyball team. On club level he plays for Corigliano Volley SSD ARL.

References

National Team
 2019 Asian Men's Volleyball Championship – Best Outside Spikers

External links
 profile at FIVB.org

1995 births
Living people
Australian men's volleyball players
Place of birth missing (living people)
Outside hitters